Nanpiao District  is a district under the administration of the city of Huludao, Liaoning province, People's Republic of China.

The administrative center of the district is Nanpiao town, which is linked to central Huludao by bus and train services.

Administrative divisions
There are seven subdistricts, two towns, and two townships within the district.

Subdistricts:
Jiulong Subdistrict, Jiulong Subdistrict, Qiupigou Subdistrict, Xiaolinghe Subdistrict, Zhaojiatun Subdistrict, Weizigou Subdistrict, Shaguotun Subdistrict, Sanjiazi Subdistrict

Towns:
Nuanchitang, Gangyaoling

Townships:
Shaguotun Township, Huangtukan Township

References

External links

County-level divisions of Liaoning
Huludao